Jondor is an urban-type settlement in Bukhara Region in Uzbekistan. It is the seat of Jondor District.

References

Populated places in Bukhara Region
Urban-type settlements in Uzbekistan